The 1928 Anhalt state election was held on 20 May 1928 to elect the 36 members of the Landtag of the Free State of Anhalt.

Results

References 

Anhalt
Elections in Saxony-Anhalt